Nathanael Matthaeus von Wolf, Nathanael Matthäus von Wolf,  (28 January 1724 in Konitz – 15 December 1784 in Gdańsk) was a German botanist, physician, and astronomer.

Wolf was born in Chojnice (Konitz) in Royal Prussia, Crown of the Kingdom of Poland. He went to study medicine at the University of Erfurt and received his degree of M.D. in 1748. He became the personal physician of Teodor Kazimierz Czartoryski, the Prince-bishop of Poznań, until the bishop's death in 1768. The next year he opened a private office at Tczew and then following the First Partition of Poland in 1772 moved his practise to Danzig (Gdańsk) which remained part of Poland.  He went on to spend most of his adult life in Danzig. He was elected a Fellow of the Royal Society in 1777.

As an astronomer, Wolf also taught the Corps of Cadets in Warsaw. He was a member  of the Danzig Research Society (Naturforschende Gesellschaft Danzig) and left his scientific collections to them. He greatly supported the building of a planetarium.

On 10 May 1785, a few months after Wolf's death, the Danzig physician Philipp Adolph Lampe presented a memorial at the Danzig Research Society.

Notes

Works 
Genera Plantarum, Vocabulis characteristicis definita  S.l. 1776
Genera et Species Plantarum vocabulis characteristicis definita. Marienwerder, Typis Joan. Jac. Kanteri, 1781
Concordantia Botanica. Dantisci, Muller, 1780

References 
 J.C. Poggendorff (1863). Biographisch-Literarisches Handwörterbuch zur geschichte der exacten wissenschaften. Verlag von Johann Ambrosius Barth. (Leipzig).
 Edmund Cieślak "Historia Gdańska", t. III, /1:1655-1793, Gdańsk 1993
 Kazimierz Kubik & Lech Mokrzecki "Trzy wieki nauki gdańskiej", Zakład Narodowy im. Ossolińskich, Gdańsk 1976 (s. 125-126) 
 "Mieszczaństwo gdańskie", Gdańskie Towarzystwo Naukowe, Gdańsk 1997 

1724 births
1782 deaths
18th-century Prussian people
18th-century German physicians
18th-century German astronomers
18th-century German botanists
Fellows of the Royal Society
Prussian nobility
People from Chojnice